There are many different varieties of pasta. They are usually sorted by size, being long (pasta lunga), short (pasta corta), stuffed (ripiena), cooked in broth (pastina), stretched (strascinati) or in dumpling-like form (gnocchi/gnocchetti). Yet, due to the variety of shapes and regional variants, "one man's gnocchetto can be another's strascinato".

Some pasta varieties are uniquely regional and not widely known; many types have different names based on region or language. For example, the cut rotelle is also called ruote in Italy and wagon wheels in the United States. Manufacturers and cooks often invent new shapes of pasta, or may rename pre-existing shapes for marketing reasons.

Italian pasta names often end with the masculine plural diminutive suffixes -ini, -elli, -illi, -etti or the feminine plurals -ine, -elle etc., all conveying the sense of "little"; or with the augmentative suffixes -oni, -one, meaning "large". Other suffixes like -otti ("largish") and -acci ("rough", "badly made") may also occur. In Italian, all pasta type names are plural.

Long- and medium-length pasta 
Long pasta may be made by extrusion or rolling and cutting.

Short-cut pasta 
Short-cut pasta (''pasta corta'') are mostly made by extrusion.

Stretched pasta 
Strascinati are mostly hand-made disks of pasta dragged (strascinato) across a wooden board. Orecchiette are a typical example.

Soup pasta 
These are small types of pasta, mainly used in soups, many of which belong to the pastina ("small pasta") family.

Filled pasta 
The name raviolo (plur. ravioli) can be used as a generic description for almost any type of filled pasta.

Gnocchi and gnocchetti

See also 

 Italian cuisine
 List of Italian dishes
 Ragù a meat-based sauce in Italian cuisine that is often served with pasta
 Semolina wheat middlings of durum wheat used in making pasta
 List of noodles

References

Sources

External links

 Types Of Pasta: The 21 Most Commonly Used
 The Ultimate List Of Types of Pasta. Nonnabox.com.

Pasta
Pasta dishes
Pasta dishes